Bosnia primarily refers to Bosnia and Herzegovina, a country in southeastern Europe.

Bosnia may also refer to:
Bosnia (region), a region in southeastern Europe
Administrative entities in the history of Bosnia and Herzegovina
Banate of Bosnia, autonomous part of the Kingdom of Hungary
Kingdom of Bosnia, a medieval kingdom
Bosnia Sanjak, a province of the Ottoman Empire
Bosnia Eyalet, a province of the Ottoman Empire
Bosnia Vilayet, a province of the Ottoman Empire
Condominium of Bosnia and Herzegovina, a province of the Austro-Hungarian Empire
Socialist Republic of Bosnia and Herzegovina, constituent part of the SFR Yugoslavia
Republic of Bosnia and Herzegovina, the main predecessor to the country before the Yugoslav wars
Federation of Bosnia and Herzegovina, a political entity that is part of the country
Bosnia (album), an album by Grand Funk Railroad
"Bosnia", a song by the Cranberries from To the Faithful Departed

See also
 Herzegovina (disambiguation)
Name of Bosnia
 Bosna (disambiguation)
 Bosnian (disambiguation)
 Bosniak (disambiguation)
 Bosniaks (disambiguation)
 Western Bosnia (disambiguation)